Peto Municipality is one of 106 municipalities in Yucatán State, Mexico. It has a municipal seat of the same name and is located in the centre-south portion of the Yucatán, 135 km to the south-east of state capital Mérida.

Communities
The municipality is made up of 74 communities, the most important include the following:

Peto (Municipal Seat)
Xoy
Yaxcopil
Tixhualatun
Progresito

Additional Data
City population (2005): 18,177
City Founded: 1549
Annual fairs: 29 April to 3 May; 26 December to 2 January
Media: XEPET-AM, a government-run indigenous community radio station.

References

Municipalities of Yucatán